The following is a list of chief justices of the North Dakota Supreme Court.

See also the List of justices of the North Dakota Supreme Court

External links
North Dakota Supreme Court website

Supreme Court Chief Justices
Nortth Dakota